The Ottawa Avenue Cemetery is located in Ottawa, Illinois. It was founded as the Ottawa Cemetery Association in 1847 by George H. Norris and was incorporated in 1865.

Notable burials

 William D. Boyce (1858–1929), social reformer and founder of the Boy Scouts of America
 William Cullen (1826–1914), US Congressman
 Douglas Hapeman (1839–1905), Civil War Medal of Honor Recipient
 George Marsh (1836–1915) Civil War Medal of Honor Recipient

References

External links 
 
 Ottawa Avenue Cemetery Website

Ottawa, Illinois
Cemeteries in Illinois
Protected areas of LaSalle County, Illinois
1847 establishments in Illinois